John Louis I, Count of Nassau-Wiesbaden-Idstein (10 April 1567 – 10 June 1596) was the son of Count Balthasar of Nassau-Wiesbaden-Idstein and his wife Margaret of Isenburg-Bierstein.  He succeeded his father in 1568 as Count of Nassau-Wiesbaden.

Marriage and issue
In 1588, John Louis married Maria of Nassau-Dillenburg, daughter of John VI, Count of Nassau-Dillenburg.  They had the following children:
 Margaret (1589-1660), married in 1606 with Adolph of Bentheim, son of Arnold III, Count of Bentheim-Steinfurt-Tecklenburg-Limburg
 Anna Catherine (1590-1622), married in 1607 with Simon VII, Count of Lippe
 Juliana (1593-1605)
 John Philip (1595-1599), his successor with his brother John Louis II until his death
 John Louis II (1596-1605), his successor, the last male of Nassau-Wiesbaden-Idstein line

House of Nassau
Counts of Nassau
1567 births
1596 deaths
16th-century German people
Counts of Nassau-Wiesbaden-Idstein